Manfred Poerschke (also spelled Pörschke, born 26 February 1934) is a German sprinter. He competed in the men's 4 × 400 metres relay at the 1956 Summer Olympics.

References

External links
 

1934 births
Living people
German male sprinters
Olympic athletes of the United Team of Germany
Athletes (track and field) at the 1956 Summer Olympics
European Athletics Championships medalists
Sportspeople from Dortmund
20th-century German people
21st-century German people